The 1961 Maryland Terrapins football team represented the University of Maryland in the 1961 NCAA University Division football season. In their third season under head coach Tom Nugent, the Terrapins compiled a 7–3 record (3–3 in conference), finished in third place in the Atlantic Coast Conference, and outscored their opponents 156 to 141. The team's statistical leaders included Dick Shiner with 921 passing yards, Ernie Arizzi with 369 rushing yards, and Gary Collins with 428 receiving yards.

Schedule

References

Maryland
Maryland Terrapins football seasons
Maryland Terrapins football